Stična Abbey (also ; , Latin: Sitticum) is the oldest monastery in Slovenia. It is the only Cistercian monastery in the country still operating (the other was Kostanjevica Abbey in Kostanjevica na Krki). Its mother house was Rein Abbey in Austria.

History 
The abbey foundation charter was issued in 1136 by Pellegrinus I, Patriarch of Aquileia, although monastic life had begun a year earlier, in 1135. The monastery at Stična quickly became an important religious, cultural, and economic centre.

In addition to an ordinary school, the monastery also operated a music school, where the Renaissance composer Jacobus Gallus is believed to have received his earliest musical education. The successful life of the monastery was hampered by Ottoman raids, and was burned and looted twice. In 1784 Emperor Joseph II abolished the monastery, dissolved under the Josephine Reforms, but it was resettled again in 1898 by monks from Mehrerau Abbey on the shore of Lake Constance.

During the Second World War, the Partisans use the abbey as a prison for priests that they had captured.

Stična manuscript 
The monastery's scriptorium was already producing illuminated Latin manuscripts in the 12th century, and it was here that the Stična manuscript, written in Slovene, was produced in the 15th century.

Architecture 
In terms of architecture, abbey has been repeatedly modified, leaving Romanesque and Gothic traces in Baroque buildings. The oldest core of the abbey has been preserved. The abbey has a basilica dedicated to Our Lady of Sorrows, which serves as a parish church. The abbey and Romanesque basilica are recognized as cultural monuments of national significance.

List of abbots

Institutions and festivities related to the abbey 
They abbey at one point had a high school inside, at the present there is a Museum of Christianity and a parish of Stična. Every year there is a cultural youth festivity called Stična mladih.

Museum of Christianity in Slovenia 

The Museum is state owned and serves as a central museum institution on the topic of sacral heritage.

Sitik d.o.o. 
Abbey of Stična made a part of the economical tourism and herbalic pharmacy available to the laymen. A small teahouse with kindergarten toys and tourist shop is pretty. Pharmacy of late cistercian herbalist Simon Ašič has become an important reminder of the gardening that was a traditional occupancy of the monks. Sittik d.o.o. handles even some serious gardening and nourishes on 4000 m2 about 250.000 room plants every year.

Festival Stična mladih 
Festival Stična mladih is a yearly event where about 8000 young people come to have fun. The entire program in mostly organized and led by young people from Slovenia. The event was inspired by the World Youth Day, theme of a festival is copied from the theme of the World Youth Day, even the program of the festival is inspired by the Popes message to the young.

Stiška gimnazija, Gymnasium of Stična 
Josip Jurčič High School was founded in 1945 as an incomplete high school. In 1946 the teachings began in the abbey. The School became complete in 1950, but more than once existence of the school was questionable. In 1970 school got the name after the known local writer and journalist. In 1980 Municipality of Grosuplje decided to move away from the Abbey in to bigger quarters. In  June 1984 the last generation of students who were taught in the abbey concluded their high school education.

References

Sources 

 Jože Mlinarič, Stiška opatija 1136-1784, Novo mesto 1995, Dolenjska založba
 Ivan Stopar, Hrami tišine, Ljubljana 2009, Viharnik
 Vanja Požegar, Cistercijani in nastanek cisterc na Slovenskem, Maribor 2009, bachelor's thesis
 http://cistercijani.sticna.si/
 http://sticna.rkc.si/sl/
 http://sitik.si/
 Bahor, Stanislav: "Skriti knjižni zakladi" Ljubjana, NUK, 2009 
 Trnovšek, Tadej: "Zaklad pisarja Bernarda" Stična, Muzej krščanstva na Slovenskem, 2011 
 Golob, Nataša: "Srednjeveški kodeksi iz Stične: XII. stoletje", Ljubljana, Slovenska knjiga, 1994

External pages 

Stična Abbey
 Consecration to the Hearts of Jesus and Mary
 Stična Youth Festival 
 Stična Manuscript. National and University Library of Slovenia.

Christian monasteries in Slovenia
Cistercian monasteries
Municipality of Ivančna Gorica